The Oberliga or DDR-Eishockey-Oberliga was the top level of ice hockey in East Germany. From 1949 to 1970, the increasingly popular sport of ice hockey saw the creation of a variety of leagues, with the Oberliga at the top level. However, in 1970 funding for all but two ice hockey teams (SG Dynamo Weißwasser and SC Dynamo Berlin) was abruptly ended by the Politburo. Some of the de-funded teams went on to participate in the DDR-Bestenermittlung, an unofficial continuation of the former "Gruppenliga" (the second league below the Oberliga until 1970).

Teams

1970-1990
 SG Dynamo Weißwasser
 SC Dynamo Berlin

1949-1970
 SG Dynamo Weißwasser (Previously known as BSG Ostlgas Weißwasser and BSG Chemie Weißwasser.)
 SC Dynamo Berlin
 SG Deutsche Volkspolizei Berlin
 TSC Berlin
 Empor Rostock
 Turbine Erfurt
 ASK Crimmitschau
 Einheit Dresden
 SC Karl-Marx-Stadt
 SG Frankenhausen (became BSG Zwickau in 1955 and SC Karl-Marx-Stadt in 1956.)
 SG Apolda
 SG Schierke
 SG Grün Weiß Pankow

Past winners

 1949 SG Frankenhausen
 1950 SG Frankenhausen
 1951 BSG Ostglas Weißwasser
 1952 BSG Chemie Weißwasser
 1953 BSG Chemie Weißwasser
 1954 SG Dynamo Weißwasser
 1955 SG Dynamo Weißwasser
 1956 SG Dynamo Weißwasser
 1957 SG Dynamo Weißwasser
 1958 SG Dynamo Weißwasser
 1959 SG Dynamo Weißwasser
 1960 SG Dynamo Weißwasser
 1961 SG Dynamo Weißwasser
 1962 SG Dynamo Weißwasser
 1963 SG Dynamo Weißwasser
 1964 SG Dynamo Weißwasser
 1965 SG Dynamo Weißwasser
 1966 SC Dynamo Berlin
 1967 SC Dynamo Berlin
 1968 SC Dynamo Berlin
 1969 SG Dynamo Weißwasser
 1970 SG Dynamo Weißwasser
 1971 SG Dynamo Weißwasser
 1972 SG Dynamo Weißwasser
 1973 SG Dynamo Weißwasser
 1974 SG Dynamo Weißwasser
 1975 SG Dynamo Weißwasser
 1976 SC Dynamo Berlin
 1977 SC Dynamo Berlin
 1978 SC Dynamo Berlin
 1979 SC Dynamo Berlin
 1980 SC Dynamo Berlin
 1981 SG Dynamo Weißwasser
 1982 SC Dynamo Berlin
 1983 SC Dynamo Berlin
 1984 SC Dynamo Berlin
 1985 SC Dynamo Berlin
 1986 SC Dynamo Berlin
 1987 SC Dynamo Berlin
 1988 SC Dynamo Berlin
 1989 SG Dynamo Weißwasser
 1990 SG Dynamo Weißwasser

See also
 East Germany national ice hockey team
 DDR-Bestenermittlung

References 

Sports 123

 

 
1
Sports leagues established in 1949
1949 establishments in East Germany
Recurring events disestablished in 1990
1990 disestablishments in Germany